The Canadian Forces Leadership and Recruit School (CFLRS) is located at the Saint-Jean Garrison in Saint-Jean-sur-Richelieu, Quebec.

Courses offered
The two main courses offered at CFLRS are the Basic Military Qualification (BMQ) for Regular Force Non-Commissioned Members, and the Basic Military Officer Qualification (BMOQ) for Regular Force Officers.
The basic training courses can be physically and psychologically demanding, and recruits undergo tremendous physical and mental stress during the training.

Responsibilities

The School is responsible for the Distance Learning portion of the Canadian Forces Primary Leadership Qualification (PLQ). Unlike the BMOQ and BMQ courses which are aimed at recruits and officer cadets, the PLQ is for more senior military members.

The School is also responsible for the Canadian Armed Forces Junior Officer Development (CAFJOD) program which exposes Junior Officers from the Regular and Reserve Forces to a general and standardized body of foundational knowledge through seven Distance Learning modules.

The school's motto is "Learn to Serve" (French: "Apprendre à servir").

References

External links
Official Website

Canadian Armed Forces education and training establishments
Educational institutions established in 1968
Education in Saint-Jean-sur-Richelieu
Leadership training
1968 establishments in Quebec